Lighthouse Beach is a beach in Coos County, Oregon, United States. It is located between Yoakam Point State Natural Site to the north and Cape Arago Lighthouse to the south, in the unincorporated community of Charleston.

References

Beaches of Oregon